Fathima Azquiya Hafza Usuph (born 24 March 2000) is a Sri Lankan female snowboarder. She competed at the 2017 Asian Winter Games, which was also the first instance where Sri Lanka was eligible to participate in an Asian Winter Games event. Usuph was the only woman to represent Sri Lanka in the Asian Winter Games held in 2017. Azquiya Usuph competed in the Women's giant slalom event.

In 2016, she won the gold medal for snowboarding in the Dream Program Games.

References

External links 
 

2000 births
Living people
Sri Lankan female snowboarders
Snowboarders at the 2017 Asian Winter Games